Millersburg Township is located in Mercer County, Illinois. As of the 2010 census, its population was 755 and it contained 334 housing units.

Millersburg is named after George Abraham Miller, a Primitive Baptist who, with several families, settled in Mercer County, Illinois on the Edwards River in 1834. These  families traveled from  Crawfordsville, Montgomery County, Indiana for the purpose of expanding the church into the area. The congregation was known as the Edwards River Church of Regular Baptists. The Church was  disbanded in 1847, and the last of the Original settlers Isaac Miller, left for Oregon in 1851.

Geography

Demographics

References

External links
City-data.com
Illinois State Archives
Miller Family Genealogy and history
Primitive Baptist Churches in Mercer County, Illinois (The founding of Millersburg)

Townships in Mercer County, Illinois
Townships in Illinois